Nathan Bristol (March 7, 1805 Harpersfield, Delaware County, New York – March 1, 1874 Port Jervis, Orange County, New York) was an American merchant and politician from New York.

Life
In April 1833, he married Cornelia Davis.

He was Supervisor of the Town of Harpersfield in 1833 and 1834. He was a member of the New York State Assembly (Delaware Co.) in 1840. Afterwards he removed to Factoryville (now Waverly), in Tioga County, New York, and engaged in the lumber trade.

He was a member of the New York State Senate (23rd D.) in 1852 and 1853.

He died at the home of his son-in-law Dr. Solomon Van Etten (1829–1894) in Port Jervis.

Sources
 
 Bio transcribed from Oor County and Its People: A Memorial History of Tioga County by LeRoy W. Kingman (Elmira NY, 1897)
 History of Harpersfield
 Marriage notices transcribed from the Delaware Gazette (1819–1900,) at US Gen Web
 Van Etten genealogy at US Gen Net

1805 births
1874 deaths
Democratic Party members of the New York State Assembly
Democratic Party New York (state) state senators
People from Delaware County, New York
People from Waverly, Tioga County, New York
Town supervisors in New York (state)
19th-century American politicians